Nikole Beckwith is an American director, screenwriter, and playwright. She has also performed live with a handful of bands and sings on Tiger Saw's 2005 record Sing! and Sam Rosen's 2006 release "The Look South".

Early life
Beckwith grew-up in Newburyport, Massachusetts. From age 16, she attended the Sudbury Valley School in Framingham, Massachusetts. While in Massachusetts, Beckwith was involved with the theater, music and art communities. In 2004, she became the youngest recipient of The Johnson Award for excellence in and contributions to the arts in the Merrimack Valley. She authored a short book of poems, Rhymes With Blue, which was released in a limited run by Independent Submarine in 2001.

In 2006, she moved to New York City. Beckwith was a three time Manhattan Monologue Slam champion and is currently a member of Ensemble studio theatre's YoungBlood playwright's group and The Striking Viking Story Pirates.

Career

Film 
She wrote and directed the feature film of Stockholm, Pennsylvania about a young woman who is returned home to her biological parents after living with her abductor for 17 years. It premiered at the 2015 Sundance Film Festival. The film was acquired by Lifetime and premiered on their TV channel on May 2, 2015. Her screenplay Stockholm, Pennsylvania won a 2012 Nicholl Fellowship in Screenwriting. She wrote two episodes of the second season of the Youtube Original series Impulse in 2019.

Beckwith wrote and directed the film Together Together about a young loner who becomes gestational surrogate for a man in his 40s. The film had its world premiere in the U.S. Dramatic Competition section of the Sundance Film Festival on January 31, 2021, and a limited theatircal release on April 23, 2021.

Theater 
She has written multiple plays. Her full-length plays include Everything Is Ours; Imagine My Sadness; Stockholm, Pennsylvania; and Untitled Matriarch Play (Or Seven Sisters). Beckwith has also written many short plays, including How it Tastes, Have Your Cake, and Nice Place to Visit, which was commissioned by Old Vic New Voices.

Personal life 
Beckwith splits her time between Massachusetts and Los Angeles.

References

External links

Writers from Newburyport, Massachusetts
Year of birth missing (living people)
Place of birth missing (living people)
Living people
American women dramatists and playwrights
American women film directors
American women screenwriters
Film directors from Massachusetts
Screenwriters from Massachusetts
21st-century American women